Martín García Avilés (born 7 April 1974) is a Mexican politician from the Party of the Democratic Revolution. From 2009 to 2012 he served as Deputy of the LXI Legislature of the Mexican Congress representing Michoacán.

References

1974 births
Living people
Politicians from Michoacán
Party of the Democratic Revolution politicians
21st-century Mexican politicians
Deputies of the LXI Legislature of Mexico
Members of the Chamber of Deputies (Mexico) for Michoacán
Universidad Michoacana de San Nicolás de Hidalgo alumni